The World Day of Prayer is an international ecumenical Christian laywomen's initiative. It is run under the motto “Informed Prayer and Prayerful Action,” and is celebrated annually in over 170 countries on the first Friday in March. The movement aims to bring together women of various races, cultures and traditions in a yearly common Day of Prayer, as well as in closer fellowship, understanding and action throughout the year.

History
The Women's World Day of Prayer started in the US in 1887 when Mary Ellen Fairchild James, wife of Darwin Rush James from Brooklyn, New York, called for a day of prayer for home missions, and Methodist women called for a week of prayer and self-denial for foreign missions. Two years later, two Baptists called together a Day of Prayer for the World Mission. The Day of Prayer initiated by these two women expanded to Canada in 1922, then to the British Isles in the 1930s. The movement's focus on ecumenism and reconciliation led to growth after World War II. Since 1927 the day of prayer in the month of March has been known as the Women's World Day of Prayer. Catholic women joined the movement after the Second Vatican Council, beginning in 1967, and united what had been their May day of prayer with the March Women's World Day of Prayer in 1969. As such, Catholic women honor the World Day of Prayer.

Two other Christian denominations celebrate a World Day of Prayer in September. Firstly, the Unity Church, a New Thought denomination headquartered at Unity Village, Missouri celebrates a twenty-four-hour World Day of Prayer, principally on the second Thursday in September (member churches may start at sunset on September 11, and the themes differ from those of the Women's World Day of Prayer set forth below). And secondly, the terrorist events of September 11, 2001 prompted the Knights of Columbus, a Catholic fraternal order, to designate that date annually as a World Day of Prayer for Peace.

Aims
Through the  World Day of Prayer, women are encouraged  to become aware of the other countries and cultures and no longer live in isolation. They are also encouraged take up the burdens of other people, to sympathize with the problems of other countries and cultures and pray with and for them. They are further encouraged to become aware of their talents and use them in the service of society. The World Day of Prayer aims to demonstrate that prayer and action are inseparable and that both have immeasurable influence in the world.

Programme
Every year, worship service focuses on a different country and a specific theme. World Day of Prayer National/Regional Committees of that country prepare the order of worship on these themes  to be used on the next World Day of Prayer.

On the first Friday of March, then, in services all over the world that country becomes the focus of prayer and understanding. Through preparation and participation in the worship service, women worldwide learn how their sisters of other countries, languages and cultures understand the biblical passages in their context. They learn of the concerns and needs of those women and to empathize and feel in solidarity with them.

World Day of Prayer themes and writer countries
see

Forthcoming World Day of Prayer themes and writer countries

See also

 Christian ecumenism

References

External links
 World Day of Prayer
 Australia
 Canada
 England, Wales, Northern Ireland
 France
 Germany
 Scotland
 Switzerland
 USA

Christian prayer
Christian events
March observances